Sunset 102 was an Incremental radio station, a new type of station licensed by the Independent Broadcasting Authority in 1989. It was the first of a series of licenses awarded by the IBA in areas already served by an Independent Local Radio station. Each station had to offer output not already available on ILR, such as specialist music or unique programmes for a specific section of the community.

History
Sunset 102 went into liquidation in October 1993.

In May of the same year, the Radio Authority made a decision to prematurely terminate Sunset's licence, apparently accusing the station of providing inaccurate information about its financial and management affairs. In August 1993, the station reportedly had its transmission facilities withdrawn by NTL for non-payment. Following a brief return to the air, the liquidator was called in and the station fell silent.

The liquidator was later to re-apply on behalf of Sunset Radio for its re-advertised licence - but lost out to Faze FM, who proposed another dance music format. Faze used the name Kiss 102 for their station which they licensed from London station Kiss 100. It was later sold to Chrysalis Radio and re-branded to Galaxy 102. Their owners were then bought by Global Radio and the station became part of the Galaxy Network.

On 3 January 2011, Galaxy, along with Global's Hit Music Network and several other stations were all rebranded to form the Capital network. Other than the weekday drivetime shows and local news, the majority of Capital's output is networked from London.

Relaunch

At 7am on Monday 12 October 2015 the station relaunched as The New Sunset Radio streaming on the internet and DAB Digital radio, in the Manchester area, as part of a 9-month trial that includes several other stations.

The output is similar with many of the original DJs including Mike Shaft, Steve Quirk and Audrey L. Hall.

Sunset DJs/presenters
Ray Rose
Pete Baker
Duncan Smith 
Steve Quirk
Jagger & Woody
Mix Factory (Higgy, Mark XTC, Dave Pullen, Keith Biggs, Stubby)
Andy Wiz***
Hacienda DJs (Dave Rofe,Pete Robinson)
Mike Lewis
Hewan Clarke
Dave Mason
Massey & Frankie Shields
Simon M
808 State 
Mike Shaft 
DJ Leaky Fresh
Terry Christian
Liam Howlett
Sami B
Paul Hollins
Deval
Greg Edwards
Paul Harvey
Cousin Matty
Laney D
Clash - DJ Carlos (Renegade FM), DJ Jay Warden, DJ Moggy, JFMC (MC) 
Larry Benji
DJ Clarkee

References

External links
Manchester Evening News article
New Sunset Radio website 
Sunset Radio returns to Manchester on DAB
Sunset 102 The Kickin FM group on Facebook
YouTube Channel dedicated to archiving all available Sunset 102 broadcasts
Sunset 102 history part 1 
Sunset 102 history part 2 
Sunset 102 programme schedule 
808 State show on Sunset 102 

Dance radio stations
Defunct radio stations in the United Kingdom
Radio stations in Manchester